José Luis Comellas García-Llera (2 April 1929 – 23 April 2021) was a Spanish astronomer, historian, and academic.

References

1929 births
2021 deaths
20th-century Spanish astronomers
20th-century Spanish historians
University of Santiago de Compostela alumni
Complutense University of Madrid alumni
Academic staff of the University of Santiago de Compostela
Academic staff of the University of Seville
People from Ferrol, Spain